The 30th Trampoline Gymnastics World Championships was held at the Ocean Center in Daytona Beach, Florida, from November 7–9, 2014.

Medal summary

Medal table

Results

Men's results

Individual Trampoline
Qualification

Final
The men's individual trampoline final was held on November 9.

Synchro
The men's synchro event was held on November 8.

Double Mini
The men's double mini event was held on November 8.

Tumbling
The men's tumbling event was held on November 9.

Women's Results

Individual Trampoline
Qualification

Final
The women's individual trampoline event was held on November 8.

Synchro
The women's synchro final was held on November 9.

Double Mini
The women's double mini event was held on November 9.

Tumbling
The women's individual tumbling final was held on November 8.

References

World Trampoline Championships
2014
Sports in Daytona Beach, Florida
International gymnastics competitions hosted by the United States
Trampoline World Championships
Trampoline
Trampoline World Championships